Axel Robert Gabrielsson (20 September 1886 – 1 June 1975) was a Swedish rower who competed in the 1912 Summer Olympics. Together with his elder brother Charles he was a crew member of the boat Göteborgs that was eliminated in the quarter finals of the coxed fours, inriggers tournament.

References

1886 births
1975 deaths
Swedish male rowers
Olympic rowers of Sweden
Rowers at the 1912 Summer Olympics
Sportspeople from Gothenburg